The 2016 Delaware State Hornets football team represented Delaware State University in the 2016 NCAA Division I FCS football season. They were led by second-year head coach Kenny Carter and played their home games at Alumni Stadium. They were a member of the Mid-Eastern Athletic Conference (MEAC). They finished the season 0–11, 0–8 in MEAC play to finish in last place.

Schedule

 Source: Schedule

Game summaries

at Delaware

Monmouth

at Missouri

at Morgan State

Hampton

Florida A&M

at South Carolina State

at Bethune-Cookman

North Carolina Central

North Carolina A&T

at Howard

References

Delaware State
Delaware State Hornets football seasons
College football winless seasons
Delaware State Hornets football